Corrado Fabi (born  12 April 1961) is a former racing driver from Italy.  He participated in 18 Formula One Grands Prix, debuting on 13 March 1983, scoring no championship points. He was the 1982 European Formula Two Champion driving a March-BMW.

He is the younger brother of Teo Fabi, also a racing driver. In 1984 they shared a Brabham Formula One drive, with Corrado deputising for Teo when Teo's commitments to CART racing in the USA took precedence.  After his opportunities in Formula One dried up, Corrado Fabi raced briefly in Champcars before effectively retiring to look after the family business interests.

Racing record

Career summary

Complete European Formula Two Championship results
(key) (Races in bold indicate pole position; races in italics indicate fastest lap)

Complete Formula One World Championship results
(key)

American Open-Wheel racing
(key) (Races in bold indicate pole position)

CART PPG Indy Car World Series

Complete International Formula 3000 results
(key) (Races in bold indicate pole position; races in italics indicate fastest lap.)

References

Profile at grandprix.com

1961 births
Living people
Racing drivers from Milan
Italian Formula One drivers
Brabham Formula One drivers
Osella Formula One drivers
Champ Car drivers
European Formula Two Championship drivers
International Formula 3000 drivers
World Sportscar Championship drivers

Forsythe Racing drivers